Aquatics at the 1977 Southeast Asian Games included swimming, diving and water polo events. The three sports of aquatics were held in Kuala Lumpur, Malaysia. Aquatics events was held between 20 November to 24 November.

Medal winners

Swimming 
Men's events

Women's events

Diving

Water polo

References 

1977
Southeast Asian Games
1977 Southeast Asian Games events